Mary Wimbush (19 March 1924 – 31 October 2005) was an English actress whose career spanned 60 years. Active across film, television, theatre and radio, she was nominated for the BAFTA Award for Best Supporting Actress for the 1969 film Oh! What a Lovely War. Her television credits included Poldark (1975–77), Jeeves and Wooster (1990–92), and Century Falls (1993). She played Julia Pargetter in BBC Radio 4's popular soap opera The Archers, a part she played from 1992 until her death.

Early life and education
Wimbush was born on 19 March 1924 in Kenton, Middlesex (today in North-West London). Her father was a schoolmaster and her mother had trained at RADA, but did not pursue a stage career, although the family enjoyed taking part in amateur dramatics. They moved to Berkhamsted, Hertfordshire, when Mary was four.

Wimbush was educated at the Berkhamsted School for Girls, and at St Agnes & St Michael's Convent, an Anglican school in East Grinstead. She trained at the Central School of Speech and Drama, before joining the Amersham repertory company.

Career

She first acted on radio for the BBC in 1945, later preferring the medium as it gave her more time to look after her young son, and it continued to be the medium in which she was the most active throughout her career. She played roles in hundreds of series, serials and plays, including various Shakespeare productions; Mrs Dale's Diary, The Governor's Consort (a part written especially for her by Peter Tinniswood), The Mystery of Edwin Drood and The Horse's Mouth. For the latter two productions she won Best Actress at the 1991 Sony Awards, the radio equivalent of the Oscars. In 2004 she played Eurycleia in BBC Radio 4's acclaimed dramatisation of The Odyssey. In The Archers in 1951 her character Jane Maxwell was the original stumbling block to the engagement of Phil Archer and his future (first) wife Grace. In 1965 she played schoolteacher Elsie Catcher, and was a regular on the programme for two years until the character retired. In 1969 she returned for a time as Lady Isabel Lander and she finally came back in 1992 as Julia Pargetter.

In 1959 she had acted in a radio play opposite Richard Attenborough. When making his first film as a director, 1969's Oh! What a Lovely War, he remembered her performance and cast her as the mother of the Smith family, her first film role, which won her a nomination as Best Supporting Actress at the British Academy Film Awards. She later appeared in two other films, Fragment of Fear (1970) and Vampire Circus (1972). On television, she appeared in a variety of high-profile series in supporting roles. She played Prudie Paynter in the BBC's adaptations of the Poldark novels in the 1970s, and Zasulich in 1974's Fall of Eagles. In the 1980s she appeared in the Doctor Who spin-off K-9 and Company and D.H. Lawrence adaptation Sons and Lovers (both 1981), and in the early 1990s found fame as Aunt Agatha in three series of Jeeves and Wooster, with Stephen Fry and Hugh Laurie.

In 1993 she co-starred in the dark children's fantasy serial Century Falls, an early work by acclaimed scriptwriter Russell T. Davies. She also had guest appearances in episodes of a variety of programmes during her career, from Z-Cars and All Creatures Great and Small (in the episode "A Dog's Life") in the 1970s to Midsomer Murders, Heartbeat and Doctors in the 2000s. Her final screen appearance was in a two-part episode of the BBC One medical drama Casualty in September 2004.

As with television and film, she was not particularly active in the theatre until later in her career. Prominent roles included Miss Mackay in The Prime of Miss Jean Brodie at the Royal Exchange Theatre in Manchester (1971) and Rebecca Nurse in Arthur Miller's The Crucible. Her final stage appearance came at the age of 78, in Song of the Western Men at the Minerva Theatre, Chichester.

Death

Mary Wimbush died on the evening of 31 October 2005, at the Mailbox studios of BBC Birmingham, shortly after completing work on a recording session for The Archers.

Wimbush was buried in Berkhamsted next to the graves of her parents in Rectory Lane Cemetery. Mary's elder sister, Joanna, was also buried there in 2013.

Personal life
Wimbush had one son (from her 1946 marriage with actor Howard Marion-Crawford), and two grandchildren. From 1960 until his death in 1963, she was in a relationship with the poet Louis MacNeice, having acted in several of his radio plays.

Filmography

References

Sources

External links

1924 births
2005 deaths
English film actresses
English television actresses
English stage actresses
English radio actresses
People from Kenton, London
Alumni of the Royal Central School of Speech and Drama